An Oreo is a sandwich cookie produced by Nabisco.

Oreo may also refer to:

Animals
 Oreo (spider), a genus of Australian spiders
 Oreosomatidae, a family of fish commonly called oreos
 Oreo cow, a nickname for the Scottish Belted Galloway

Arts, entertainment, and media
 Oreo (novel), a 1974 novel by Fran Ross
 The Oreo, a sculpture on the Villanova University campus, Pennsylvania

Other uses
 Oreo Cookie (slang), an ethnic slur for a black person who "acts white"
 Oreo O's, a breakfast cereal based on the Oreo cookie
 Oreus (or "Oreos"), an ancient Greek settlement
 Android Oreo, Android Operating System 8.0
 Other Real Estate Owned (OREO), real estate a bank owns that has generally been acquired through foreclosure

See also